The cedar elm cultivar Ulmus crassifolia 'Brazos Rim' was cloned from a tree growing at the Sunshine Nursery, Clinton, Oklahoma.

Description
Not available.

Pests and diseases
No information available.

Etymology
The cultivar is named for the Brazos Rim native tree nursery near Fort Worth, Texas.

External links
http://www.sunshinenursery.com/elms.htm. Rare Asiatic elms, and their resistance to elm leaf beetles etc.

Cedar elm cultivar
Ulmus articles missing images
Ulmus